This article lists the squads of the women's hockey competition at the 2014 Commonwealth Games held in Glasgow, Scotland from 24 July to 3 August 2014.

Pool A

Canada
The squad was announced on 24 June 2014.

Head coach:  Ian Rutledge

India
The squad was announced on 7 July 2014.

Head coach:  Neil Hawgood

New Zealand
The squad was announced on 25 June 2014.

Head coach:  Mark Hager

South Africa
The squad was announced on 17 June 2014.

Head coach: Sheldon Rostron

Trinidad and Tobago
Head coach: Anthony Marcano

Pool B

Australia
The squad was announced on 24 June 2014.

Head coach: Adam Commens

England
The squad was announced on 27 June 2014.

Head coach: Daniel Kerry

Malaysia
Head coach: Nasihin Ibrahim

Scotland
The squad was announced on 13 June 2014.

Head coach: Gordon Shepherd

Wales
The squad was announced on 21 May 2014.

Head coach: Amanda Partington

References

External links
Official Website

squads
2014 in women's field hockey